The Kokura Daishoten (Japanese 小倉大賞典) is a Grade 3 horse race for Thoroughbreds aged four and over, run in February over a distance of 1800 metres on turf at Kokura Racecourse.

The Kokura Daishoten was first run in 1967 and has held Grade 3 status since 1984. The race was run at Hanshin Racecourse in 1969 and 1982 and at Chukyo Racecourse in 1998, 1999 and 2010.

Winners since 2000

Earlier winners

 1984 - Yamano Shiragiko
 1985 - Global Dyna
 1986 - Machikane Ishin
 1987 - Tosho Leo
 1988 - Tosho Leo
 1989 - Daikatsu Kenzan
 1990 - Mr Yamano
 1991 - Let's Go Tarquin
 1992 - Wide Battle
 1993 - One More Love Way
 1994 - Meisho Marine
 1995 - Meisho Regnum
 1996 - Aratami Wonder
 1997 - Osumi Max
 1998 - Silence Suzuka
 1999 - Suehiro Commander

See also
 Horse racing in Japan
 List of Japanese flat horse races

References

Turf races in Japan